Pietrasanta is a town and comune on the coast of northern Tuscany in Italy, in the province of Lucca.

It lies on the main road and rail link from Pisa to Genova, just north of Viareggio.

History

The town has Roman origins and part of the Roman wall still exists.

The medieval town was founded in 1255 upon the pre-existing "Rocca di Sala" fortress of the Lombards by Luca Guiscardo da Pietrasanta, from whom it got its name.  Pietrasanta was at its height a part of the Republic of Genoa (1316–1328).  The town is first mentioned in 1331 in records of Genoa, when it became a part of the Lucca along with the river port of Motrone, and was held until 1430. At that time it passed back to Genoa until 1484, when it was annexed to the Medici held seigniory of Florence.

In 1494, Charles VIII of France took control of the town.  It remained a Luccan town again until Pope Leo X, a member of the Medici family, gave Pietrasanta back to his family. The town then became the capital of the Capitanato di Pietrasanta (Captaincy of Pietrasanta), which included all the main settlements of the historical heart of Versilia. 

The town suffered a long period of decline during the 17th and 18th centuries, partially due to malaria. In 1841, Grand Duke Leopold II of Tuscany promoted several reconstruction projects (including the building of schools specially created to teach carving skills, and the reopening of the once famous quarries).

Culture
The area, like most of Tuscany in general, has long enjoyed the patronage of artists.  Pietrasanta grew to importance during the 15th century, mainly due to its connection with marble. Michelangelo was the first sculptor to recognize the beauty of the local stone. It has continued to attract many artists including Fernando Botero, Joan Miró, Henry Moore, and Damien Hirst. The town is still home to over 50 marble workshops and bronze foundries.

Main sights
Cathedral of St. Martin (Duomo, 13th-14th centuries).
Sant'Agostino (15th century), Romanesque style former church, now seat of art exhibitions. It includes remnants of 14th-15th centuries frescoes.
The Gothic Civic Tower.
Column and Fountain of the Marzocco (16th century).
Palazzo Panichi Carli (16th century).
Palazzo Moroni (16th century), home to the local Archaeological Museum.
Museo dei Bozzetti, with over 700 sculptures  by international artists
Musa, the Virtual Museum of Sculpture and Architecture

Notable people
 Eugenio Barsanti, together with Felice Matteucci invented the first version of the internal combustion engine in 1853
 Ottavio Barsanti, New Zealand missionary, priest and writer born in Pietrasanta
 Fernando Botero, Colombian painter and sculptor, lives in the commune
 Julia Vance, Norwegian Sculptor, lives in the commune
 Hanneke Beaumont, Dutch-born sculptor, lives in the commune
 Romano Cagnoni, Italian photographer, was born and lived in the commune
 Giosuè Carducci, poet and teacher; recipient of 1906 Nobel Prize in Literature
 Carlo Carli, politician
 Claude Cehes, sculptor
 Christian Dalle Mura, footballer
 Corinna Dentoni, tennis player
 Giulio Donati, footballer 
 Irene Fornaciari, opera singer 
 Cesare Galeotti, composer, conductor and concert pianist was born in Pietrasanta on 5 June 1872. He was best known for his opera Anton and Dorisse
 Silvia Gemignani, Olympic triathlete 
 Kathleen Jones, English biographer and poet, lives in the commune 
 Robert Kubica, Polish F1 driver, lives in the commune 
Massimo Mallegni, Italian Senator and former Mayor of Pietrasanta 
 Leonardo Massoni, footballer 
 Igor Mitoraj, Polish sculptor, lived in the commune 
 David Philippaerts, Grand Prix motocross world champion 
 Diego Romanini, race car driver 
 Luca Tesconi, Olympic sport shooter 
 Nicola Vizzoni, Olympic hammer thrower
 Neil Estern, American Sculptor
 Morten Søndergaard, Danish poet
 Merete Pryds Helle, Danish author
 Jørgen Haugen Sørensen, Danish sculptor
 Kirsten Ortwed, Danish sculptor
 Håkon Anton Fagerås, Norwegian sculptor
 Daniele Taccola, Italian Doctor and Politic

Sister cities
Pietrasanta is twinned with
 Écaussinnes, Belgium
 Grenzach-Wyhlen, Germany
 Villeparisis, France
 Zduńska Wola, Poland
 Montgomery, USA
 Utsunomiya, Japan

References

External links
Official website 
Pietrasanta Portal 
Video Introduction to Pietrasanta  

Cities and towns in Tuscany